Awara Badal is a 1964 Bollywood film directed by B. R. Ishara and starring Helen, Ajit and Leela Mishra.

Story
Abducted at a young age, a prince turns into a much feared masked bandit.

Cast

Music
Tne film's songs were composed by Usha Khanna and penned by Javed Akhtar.

References

External links
 

Films scored by Usha Khanna
1964 films
1960s Hindi-language films
Films directed by B. R. Ishara